Kirkby Lonsdale Rugby Club is an English rugby union club based in Kirkby Lonsdale, Cumbria. The first XV team currently play in Regional 1 North West, having reached the national levels of the sport for the first time in 2017.

Honours
25 Feb 2023 Recorded RFU record defeat of 190-0 against Blackburn RUFC
Westmorland & Furness Cup winners (3): 1986, 1997, 2004
North-West North 1 champions: 1988–89
Cumbria Shield winners: 2001
North Lancashire 1 winners: 2006–07
North Lancashire/Cumbria v South Lancs/Cheshire 1 promotion play-off winners (2): 2009–10, 2011–12
North 1 West champions: 2016–17

Notes

References

English rugby union teams
Rugby clubs established in 1877
Rugby union in Cumbria
Kirkby Lonsdale